Brenthia cubana is a moth of the family Choreutidae. It is known from Cuba.

The length of the forewings is about 3.5 mm.

References

Brenthia
Endemic fauna of Cuba